Hangares metro station is a Mexico City Metro station in Venustiano Carranza, Mexico City. It is an underground station with two side platforms, served by Line 5 (the Yellow Line), between Terminal Aérea and Pantitlán stations. Hangares metro station serves the colonia of Federal, located next to the Mexico City International Airport. The station was opened on 19 December 1981, on the first day of the then Consulado–Pantitlán service. The pictogram for the station features a biplane inside a hangar and its name is on account of its proximity to the airport's hangars. In 2019, the station had an average daily ridership of 4,856 passengers, making it the 188th busiest station in the network and the twelfth busiest of the line.

Location
Hangares is a metro station located on Fuerza Aérea Mexicana Avenue, in the Venustiano Carranza borough, in eastern Mexico City, that serves the colonia (Mexican Spanish for "neighborhood") of Federal. Within the system, the station lies between Terminal Aérea and Pantitlán stations. The station is located near the Mexico City International Airport. The area is serviced by Route 11-C of the city's public bus system.

Exits
There are two exits:
North: Fuerza Aérea Mexicana Avenue, Federal.
South: Correos y Telégrafos Street and Asistencia Pública Street, Federal.

Landmarks
A pedestrian bridge nicknamed "MacPuente" is near the station.

History and construction

Line 5 of the Mexico City Metro was built by Cometro, a subsidiary of Empresas ICA, and its first section was opened on 19 December 1981, operating from Pantitlán to Consulado metro stations. Hangares is an underground station whose station pictogram features a biplane inside a hangar in reference to its proximity to the airports' hangars.

Incidents
After the 2015 Oceanía metro station train crash, Hangares metro station was temporarily closed for repairs. From 1 to 16 March 2020, Terminal Aérea, Hangares, and Pantitlán stations were closed due to a leak of gasoline in a surface petrol station. From 23 April to 15 June 2020, the station was temporarily closed due to the COVID-19 pandemic in Mexico.

Ridership
According to the data provided by the authorities since the 2000s, commuters have averaged per year between 2,100 and 5,700 daily entrances in the last decade. In 2019, before the impact of the COVID-19 pandemic on public transport, the station's ridership totaled 1,772,609 passengers, which was a decrease of 721,611 passengers compared to 2018. In the same year, Hangares metro station was the 188th busiest station of the system and it was the line's second-least used station.

Notes

References

External links

1981 establishments in Mexico
Mexico City Metro Line 5 stations
Mexico City Metro stations in Venustiano Carranza, Mexico City
Railway stations located underground in Mexico
Railway stations opened in 1981